Elvange may refer to:

Elvange, Moselle, a commune in northeastern France
Elvange, Luxembourg, a village in southeastern Luxembourg